Maurice Dockrell may refer to:

 Maurice Dockrell (Unionist politician) (1850–1929), Irish businessman and Unionist MP for Rathmines
 Maurice E. Dockrell (1908–1986), grandson of the above and Irish Fine Gael party politician